William and Mordecai Evans House, also known as the Evans Log & Stone House, is a historic home located at Limerick Township, Montgomery County, Pennsylvania.  The original log house was built about 1720, with a stone addition built in 1763 and a frame addition in 1984.  It is a -story, four bay, stuccoed stone and log dwelling, with basement.  Also on the property are a contributing bake oven and original well. The house briefly became the headquarters for General George Washington on September 19, 1777, after the Battle of Brandywine and Battle of the Clouds at Malvern.

It was added to the National Register of Historic Places in 2005.

References

Houses on the National Register of Historic Places in Pennsylvania
Houses completed in 1763
Houses in Montgomery County, Pennsylvania
National Register of Historic Places in Montgomery County, Pennsylvania